Igor Kuljanac (born 9 August 1989) is a Slovenian football midfielder.

External links
Player profile at PrvaLiga 

1989 births
Living people
Slovenian footballers
Association football midfielders
NK Celje players